Edis Nuri is a Macedonian professional basketball power forward.

References

External links
 at Eurobasket

1982 births
Living people
Power forwards (basketball)